State Route 192 (SR 192) is an unsigned primary state highway in the U.S. state of Virginia. Known as Azalea Garden Road, the state highway runs  from SR 165 north to SR 170 within the independent city of Norfolk. SR 192 provides access to the Norfolk Botanical Garden.

Route description

SR 192 begins at an intersection with SR 165 (Military Highway) in the northeastern part of Norfolk. Azalea Garden Road continues southwest as an unnumbered street toward Downtown Norfolk, east of which the highway intersects SR 194, SR 166, and U.S. Route 58. SR 192 heads northeast as a four-lane undivided street through a densely populated residential area. The state highway crosses an arm of Lake Whitehurst before intersecting Norview Avenue, which heads east as the main entrance to Norfolk International Airport. SR 192 passes the entrance to the Norfolk Botanical Garden just before crossing another arm of the lake and veering north. The state highway reaches its northern terminus at SR 170 (Little Creek Road) west of Naval Amphibious Base Little Creek.

Major intersections

References

External links

Virginia Highways Project: VA 192

192
State Route 192